The Tornado outbreak of April 25–27, 1994 was a widespread tornado outbreak that affected much of the Central and Southern Plains of the United States as well as the Midwest and the Deep South from Colorado to New York from April 25 to April 27, 1994. The entire outbreak killed six people across two states from two different F4 tornadoes near Dallas, Texas and West Lafayette, Indiana.

Tornado event

Several scattered strong storms/supercells developed during the afternoon and late-evening hours on April 25. The most notable storm of the day produced several tornadoes across the Dallas–Fort Worth metroplex. The first tornado touchdown in the Fort Worth area but caused little if any damage. An F2 tornado shortly caused extensive damage to the town of DeSoto in Dallas County. Numerous structures were destroyed and the City Hall itself sustained major damage that totaled about $50 million.  No fatalities were reported by this tornado. However, further east, the same storm intensified and produced a violent F4 tornado that traveled through the Lancaster area killing 3 and injured nearly 50 others while destroying much of the historic downtown square. In addition to the tornadoes, extensive hail was recorded across much of the Metroplex region. Total tornado and hail figures in Texas alone on this date was estimated at $300 million.

On April 26, the most productive storm affected portions of eastern Illinois just southeast of Chicago and portions of northern and central Indiana. Shortly before 11:00 PM, an F4 tornado tore through a mobile home park and a subdivision 2 miles west of West Lafayette killing three and injuring 70 others across Tippecanoe County. The mobile home park was very heavily damaged with numerous structures being totally demolished. A factory where one of the fatalities was also heavily damaged while the two other fatalities were inside the same home. Another tornado earlier in the day caused extensive damage to the town of Gainesville, Texas and injuring eight people. Several other tornadoes were reported in and around the Gainesville tornado at the same time the parent storm tore through most of the city. Across North Texas near the Red River Valley, over 20 tornadoes were confirmed along that area alone on April 26 from roughly near Wichita Falls to west of Texarkana, Arkansas. Activity ended on April 27 with weaker tornadoes across Missouri, Kentucky and Tennessee and minimal damage reported.

Confirmed tornadoes

April 25 event

April 26 event

April 27 event

See also

 List of North American tornadoes and tornado outbreaks

Footnotes

External links
 Page on the Gainesville, Texas area tornadoes

Tornadoes of 1994
1994 natural disasters in the United States
F4 tornadoes by date
Tornadoes in Texas
Tornadoes in Indiana
Tornado outbreak
1994 meteorology
Extratropical cyclones